Life as a Fatal Sexually Transmitted Disease is a 2000 Polish drama film directed by Krzysztof Zanussi. It was Poland's submission to the 73rd Academy Awards for the Academy Award for Best Foreign Language Film. The film won the Golden St. George at the 22nd Moscow International Film Festival.

Cast
 Zbigniew Zapasiewicz as Tomasz Berg
 Krystyna Janda as Anna
 Tadeusz Bradecki as Monk Marek
 Monika Krzywkowska as Hanka
 Pawel Okraska as Filip
 Jerzy Radziwiłowicz as Starszy wioskowy
 Szymon Bobrowski as Karol
 Jerzy Nasierowski as assistant

See also
Cinema of Poland
List of submissions to the 73rd Academy Awards for Best Foreign Language Film

References

External links

2000 films
Films set in Poland
Films set in Kraków
Films shot in Poland
Films shot in Kraków
2000s Polish-language films
2000 drama films
Films about death
Films directed by Krzysztof Zanussi
Films scored by Wojciech Kilar
Polish drama films